Bath Creek is a stream in Alberta, Canada.

Bath Creek was named from an incident in 1881 when a surveyor fell into the creek.

See also
List of rivers of Alberta

References

Rivers of Alberta